Joseph A. Moore (born July 22, 1958) is a former Chicago politician. Moore was first elected to Chicago City Council as the alderman for the 49th ward, which includes the majority of Rogers Park and portions of West Ridge, in 1991. Moore won re-election six times, before losing to challenger Maria Hadden in 2019.

Education and early career
Moore was born in Chicago in 1958 and later moved to Evanston, where he graduated from Evanston Township High School in 1976. He graduated from Knox College in Galesburg, Illinois with a B.A in 1980 and earned a J.D. from DePaul University College of Law in 1984. From 1984 to 1991, Moore worked as an attorney in the City of Chicago's Department of Law, first in the department's Appeals Division and later in the department's Affirmative Litigation Division, where he worked to recover millions of dollars on behalf of the City's taxpayers.

1991 aldermanic election campaign
On November 6, 1990, 49th ward alderman David Orr was elected Cook County Clerk, creating a vacancy in the Chicago City Council until the 1991 municipal elections. Chicago's Mayor appoints replacements to fill short-term vacancies in the City Council. Orr supported Moore as his replacement. Mayor Richard M. Daley appointed Robert Clarke, a law associate of Illinois State Representative Lee Preston, the 49th ward Democratic committeeman. Moore was among the challengers to Clarke in the February, 1991 municipal elections. No candidate received a majority of the votes, requiring a run-off between the top two, Moore and Clarke, in April, 1991. Orr was Moore's campaign chairman. On April 2, 1991, Moore was elected alderman. Of eight incumbent alderman who were originally appointed by Daley to fill vacancies, Clarke was the only one to fail to win re-election that year.

Chicago City Council (1991-2019)
Moore won re-election in 1995, 1999, 2003, 2007, 2011 and in 2015. In 2019, Moore lost election to Maria Hadden.

He was chairman of the City Council Committee on Housing and Real Estate, which oversees City housing policy and all transactions involving City-owned real estate. Moore also served most recently on the following City Council committees: Budget and Government Operations; Education and Child Development; Finance; Health and Environmental Protection; Human Relations; Special Events, Cultural Affairs and Recreation; and Rules and Ethics.

Community Policing and Crime Reduction 
Moore was a pioneer in the effort to bring community policing to Chicago. The Chicago community policing strategy involves residents and other City agencies working together to prevent crime and improve the quality of life in all of Chicago's neighborhoods. Under his leadership, the 49th Ward was selected as one of the first areas of the city to host a community policing pilot project, which resulted in a 54% reduction in serious crime over a 20-year period. Additionally, from January 1, 2013 to February 26, 2013, the 24th Police District, which includes Rogers Park and the adjacent Chicago neighborhood of West Ridge, was the only of Chicago's 22 police districts in which no one was shot. Overall, Chicago Police Department data shows the rate of all reported crimes in the 49th Ward has decreased by 48% between 2003 and 2018, 4% more than the overall decline in crime across the entire city of Chicago during the same period.

Living Wage and Community Business Growth 
Moore gained national renown as a leader in the fight for living wages when he sponsored the landmark 2006 Chicago Big Box Ordinance, which required large retail stores to pay their employees a wage sufficient to keep a family of four out of poverty. The ordinance was a precursor to Chicago's minimum wage ordinance, which guarantees all workers in Chicago a wage of at least $13 an hour indexed to inflation.

Moore has also made it a priority to encourage entrepreneurs to open up new restaurants and businesses in his Ward. In 2007 Moore launched an initiative dubbed "follow me on Fridays" in which Moore encourages his constituents to join him at a local restaurant, pub, or festival twice a month after work on a Friday to promote local businesses and entrepreneurs in his Ward. The events have grown in popularity and have facilitated a recent surge in private business growth in Roger's Park.

Participatory Budgeting 

Moore became the first elected official in the United States to introduce a democratic budget allocation procedure known as participatory budgeting. Each year since 2009, Moore has turned over $1 million of his discretionary capital budget to a process of democratic deliberation and decision-making in which his constituents decide through direct vote how to allocate his budget. Moore's participatory budgeting model has since been adopted by eight of his Chicago City Council colleagues, as well as in 16 other U.S. cities, including New York City, Seattle, Boston, San Francisco and Vallejo, California. Over the past 9 years the 49th Ward constituents have voted to allocate Moore's discretionary capital budget to a wide array of projects ranging from resurfacing alleys and streets to beautifying the neighborhood through the creation of murals and planting of trees throughout the neighborhood.

Affordable Housing 
In 2016, Moore worked with a private developer and the CHA to construct 65 units of affordable housing and 46 market rate units above a new Target on North Sheridan Road. In 2017, Moore helped a developer secure City of Chicago Low Income Housing Tax Credits to build 54 affordable housing units on top of 3,300 square feet of retail storefront space at Clark and Estes. In 2018, Moore convinced the Chicago Housing Authority (CHA) to purchase Levy House at 1221 W. Sherwin, thus preserving 56 units affordable senior housing.

Moore has actively opposed an elected school board in City Council, maneuvering to block a ballot measure.

Despite 49th ward residents voting overwhelmingly to freeze charter school expansion, Moore has ignored his constituents and continued to push for more charters  as he collects campaign donations from Charter operators.

Rogers Park's schools have suffered under Moore, to the point of Gale Elementary's major issue with lead contamination  Since 1993, only $81.5 million for improvements to Roger's Park schools have been allocated by CPS, including modernization efforts at Sullivan High School, and a $5 million investment for a new roof at Kilmer School.

Community Outreach and Annual Events 

Throughout his time as Alderman, Moore has overseen the creation of a number of annual events held in Rogers Park. One the oldest of these annual events is the Rogers Park Back to School Picnic which is held on the last Sunday of every August. The picnic has grown considerably since its founding in 1991 to include activities directed at a wide audience such as face painting, live music, bingo, and bouncy castles in addition to free food and school supplies.

Also founded by Moore, is the 49th Ward Annual Spring Clean-up and Taste of Roger's Park. Normally held on the Saturday before Earth Day, the annual clean-up brings together volunteers from across the neighborhood who either choose clean-up and/or beautification projects they wish to undertake or are directed by Alderman's office to areas of the Ward that need cleaning. At the end of the day participants are then given free food from restaurants around the ward to help promote local business growth.

Additionally Moore has also overseen the creation and implementation of several other annual (sometimes biannual) events listed in the table below.

National Recognition 
During Moore's tenure, Rogers Park and Alderman Moore himself have garnered national recognition and attention. In 2008, John Nichols, Washington, D.C. correspondent for The Nation, blogging on The Nation website, named Moore "Most Valuable Local Official." Also, In its July 2016 cover story, Time included Participatory Budgeting (pioneered by Moore) as one of the "240 reasons to celebrate America right now." Additionally, a national real estate website named Rogers Park as the top neighborhood in Chicago and one of the top neighborhoods in the nation for "living well." The website, Trulia, conducted a survey of 877 neighborhoods across the U.S., and named Rogers Park the 11th best neighborhood to live in the nation for staying active and healthy, ahead of all other Chicago neighborhoods.

In addition to serving as Alderman of the 49th Ward, Moore is a former chair of the Board of Directors of the Democratic Municipal Organization, a national association of elected municipal officials, with offices in his home in Rogers Park. Moore's wife, Barbara, is the Executive Director.

Foie gras ban 

Moore was the chief sponsor of an ordinance banning the sale of foie gras in Chicago. After much publicity, the ordinance passed overwhelmingly but was repealed overwhelmingly. Moore was honored in February, 2007 by the Humane Society of the United States for his leadership on the issue of cruelty to animals. Moore's support of this issue was the subject of many widespread and derisive comments. National news organizations covered the story from many angles, some hospitable and some hostile.

Electoral history

References

External links
Citizens for Joe Moore, website of an Illinois political action committee
Chicago Reader Blogs: Clout City, May 1, 2007, accessed December 5, 2012
Alderman Joe Moore at the Chicago Reader

Joseph A. Moore News Updates and Coverage at the Chicago Tribune
Joe Moore segments on WTTW Chicago Tonight

Chicago City Council members
Illinois Democrats
Living people
1958 births
21st-century American politicians